Olli Tuominen (born 15 April 1979 in Helsinki) is a professional squash player who represented Finland. He reached a career-high world ranking of World No. 13 in February 2006.

References

External links 
 
 
 

1979 births
Living people
Finnish male squash players
Sportspeople from Helsinki